William James Cochrane (1873 – 15 June 1940) was a British surveyor and philatelist who signed the Roll of Distinguished Philatelists in 1923.

References

Signatories to the Roll of Distinguished Philatelists
1873 births
1940 deaths
British philatelists
British surveyors